Caenopangonia is a genus of horse flies in the family Tabanidae.

Species
Caenopangonia aspera (Philip, 1958)
Caenopangonia brevirostris (Philippi, 1865)
Caenopangonia cerdai Krolow, Henriques & González, 2016
Caenopangonia coscaroni Krolow, Henriques & González, 2016
Caenopangonia hirtipalpis (Bigot, 1892)

References

Tabanidae
Tabanoidea genera
Diptera of South America
Taxa named by Otto Kröber